Voest-Alpine  may refer to:

voestalpine AG (renamed 2001), Austrian steel company, or its predecessors, divisions or subsidiaries:
Vöest-Alpine AG, Austrian steel company formed in the 1970s from the merger of VÖEST and Österreichisch-Alpine Montangesellschaft 
Voest-Alpine Stahl AG, Austrian steel company formed 1988 from restructuring of nationalised Austrian steelmakers
Voest-Alpine Technologie AG, steel technology company formed 1993 from a split of the holdings of Österreichische Industrieholding AG, acquired by Siemens 2005
Voest-Alpine Industrieanlagenbau (VAI), factory/plant building subsidiary of Voest-Alpine, split 1956, now part of Siemens
 Voest-Alpine Industries, a subsidiary of VAI
 Voest-Alpine Eisenbahnsysteme, which together with Nortrak Railway Supply Ltd. formed VAE Nortrak North America, Inc.